Ronald Lynn Humphrey (born March 3, 1969) is a former American football running back in the National Football League who played for the Indianapolis Colts and the San Antonio Matadors of the Spring Football League.  He played college football for the Mississippi Valley State Delta Devils.

References

1969 births
Living people
Players of American football from Texas
American football running backs
American football return specialists
Mississippi Valley State Delta Devils football players
Indianapolis Colts players